Kõnnu is a village in Kastre Parish, Tartu County in Estonia.

First head of the Estonian government in exile as Acting Prime Minister from 1953–1962, Johannes Sikkar (1897–1960) was born in Kõnnu.

References

Villages in Tartu County